William Joseph Klaus (December 9, 1928 – December 3, 2006) was an American professional baseball shortstop and third baseman, who played in Major League Baseball (MLB) with the Boston / Milwaukee Braves (–), Boston Red Sox (–), Baltimore Orioles (–), Washington Senators, and Philadelphia Phillies (–). He played the end of the  season playing for the Chunichi Dragons of Nippon Professional Baseball (NPB).

Born in Spring Grove, Illinois, Klaus attended Grant Community High School in Fox Lake, Illinois. One of four children, his family lived on a dairy farm and at one point he had to leave high school in order to help on the farm while his father was ill. Klaus was the older brother of MLB infielder Bobby Klaus, who played for the Cincinnati Reds and New York Mets in –.

After nine games played and seven at bats without a hit during brief trials for the 1952–53 Braves, Klaus was included in one of the most important trades of the early 1950s, when Milwaukee sent him to the New York Giants on February 1, 1954, with pitchers Johnny Antonelli and Don Liddle and catcher Ebba St. Claire (plus US$50,000) for erstwhile Giants' hero Bobby Thomson and catcher Sam Calderone. The deal came out heavily in the Giants' favor, with Antonelli pitching them to the  National League (NL) pennant and world championship. Thomson, meanwhile, broke his ankle and was able to play in only 43 games that season. Klaus never appeared in a Giants' uniform; he was the all-star shortstop in the Triple-A American Association (as a Minneapolis Miller), hitting 21 home runs (HR), and was acquired by the Red Sox during the 1954–55 offseason.

In his  rookie season with the BoSox, Klaus had a career-high .283 batting average, with seven HR, and 60 runs batted in (RBI) (another career-high), and finished second place in American League Rookie of the Year voting behind Herb Score.  "On February 2, 1956, Klaus was awarded the first annual Harry Agganis Memorial Award by the Boston baseball writers as the Red Sox Rookie of the Year. ... Ted Williams sent a telegram from his home in Florida, congratulating Klaus and articulating his value to the team as only Ted could put it: “Billy Klaus was one of the greatest little competitors I ever played with.”"  A year later, he posted almost identical numbers (.271/7/59), and in  he belted a high-career 10 homers.

In an 11-season MLB career, Klaus was a .249 lifetime hitter, with 40 HR, and 250 RBI, in 821 games played. He totaled 626 hits.

After his active career, Klaus managed Minor League Baseball (MiLB) affiliates of the Senators and Oakland Athletics. When he finally left baseball completely, he worked as a painter and lived in both Sarasota Florida and North Carolina.

Klaus was inducted into the Lake County High School Sports Hall of Fame in 2001.

References

External links

Billy Klaus at SABR (Baseball BioProject)
Billy Klaus at Baseball Almanac
Billy Klaus at Baseballbiography.com
Billy Klaus at The Deadball Era

1928 births
2006 deaths
American expatriate baseball players in Japan
Appleton Papermakers players
Baseball players from Illinois
Baltimore Orioles players
Boston Braves players
Boston Red Sox players
Centralia Cubs players
Chunichi Dragons players
Clinton Cubs players
Dallas Eagles players
Major League Baseball shortstops
Milwaukee Braves players
Milwaukee Brewers (minor league) players
Minneapolis Millers (baseball) players
Minor league baseball managers
People from Fox Lake, Illinois
People from Spring Grove, Illinois
Philadelphia Phillies players
Springfield Cubs (Massachusetts) players
Toledo Sox players
Washington Senators (1961–1971) players
Washington Senators (1961–1971) scouts
York White Roses players